John Miers, FRS FLS (25 August 1789 – 17 October 1879. Kensington), knight grand cross of the Order of the Rose, was a British botanist and engineer, best known for his work on the flora of Chile and Argentina.

Miers was born in London to a jeweller from Yorkshire, and showed interest in mineralogy and chemistry from an early age. His first published work was a monograph on nitrogen which appeared in the Annals of Philosophy in 1814. After his marriage in 1818 he travelled to South America to participate in a venture to exploit the mineral resource of Chile, particularly copper. However, after landing in Buenos Aires his wife came down with childbed fever on the trip across country, and he decided not to continue to Chile, instead starting a study of the local flora, which at that time was largely unresearched.

In May 1819 Miers arrived in Santiago, Chile, having arranged the clandestine transport of coin presses, and settled at Concón, near Valparaíso. He developed business ventures with Lord Cochrane, then head of the Chilean Navy. They built a flour mill, developed plans for a ranch at Quintero, and intended becoming the major supplier of salt beef, biscuits and other supplies to the Navy

In 1825 he returned to England, and the following year published Travels in Chile and La Plata, the first of several works documenting the plants of South America. Towards the end of the decade he returned to Argentina to work on contracts with the Argentinian mint. Political instability ended this work in 1831 and he moved to Rio de Janeiro to fulfil a similar contract with the Brazilian government, returning to England in 1838. He was a Fellow of the Royal Society and assisted in the editing of the papers of others, as well as editing his own.

His most important work was Contributions to the Botany of South America (1870); other well-known works were On the Apocynaceae of South America (1878) and Illustrations of South American Plants (1789-1879). Several taxa are named in his honour.

In 1826, botanist John Lindley, published Miersia, a plant genus in the Amaryllidaceae. All 5 known species are native to Chile and Bolivia. Then in 1903, botanist Ignatz Urban published a monotypic genus of flowering plants from South America, in the Burmanniaceae as Miersiella also in John Miers's honour.

References

External links 
 
 
 On the Apocynaceae of South America : with some preliminary remarks on the whole family.... Ed. Williams and Norgate, London. 1878.

1789 births
1879 deaths
Botanists with author abbreviations
British botanists
Fellows of the Royal Society
Fellows of the Linnean Society of London
Botanical illustrators